Lady Coryell is the debut album by jazz fusion guitarist Larry Coryell, recorded when he was 25.

Reception
Lady Coryell was mostly ignored upon release but later received positive reviews. Robert Christgau gave the album a B+, stating, "Larry Coryell is the greatest thing to happen to the guitar since stretched gut" and "This is far more satisfying but still crabbed and uneven". The Rolling Stone Jazz Record Guide had a mostly positive review, saying Larry Coryell was "one of the most creative and accomplished modern electric guitarists." Jim Todd, writing for Allmusic, stated "This 1968 set is for anyone who felt let down when the early '70s promise for a truly creative, genre-busting fusion of jazz and rock swiftly disappeared in a wave of vapid, show biz values and disco frippery" but also stated that "The album's only lapse is the country corn of "Love Child Is Coming Home," where Coryell tries to transcend one genre too many."

Track listing

Personnel
 Larry Coryell – guitars, bass, vocals
 Jimmy Garrison – bass (on 7)
 Bob Moses – drums
 Elvin Jones – drums (on 7 and 9)

References

1969 debut albums
Larry Coryell albums
Vanguard Records albums
Albums produced by Larry Coryell